18 venues in 14 countries have hosted the Junior Eurovision Song Contest, an annual song competition for children, at least once since its creation in 2003. The first edition took place in the Danish capital, Copenhagen. Following the hosting problems for the 2004 edition, the location of the subsequent contests were appointed by the European Broadcasting Union (EBU), following a bidding process with broadcasters from the participating countries. Belgium was therefore the first country to successfully bid for the rights to host the contest in 2005. Poland became the first country to host two contests in a row (in 2019 and in 2020, respectively).

Originally, unlike its adult version, the winning country did not receive the rights to host the next contest. However for the contests from 2014 to 2021 (except the 2018 edition), the winning country had first refusal on hosting the next competition. Italy used this clause in 2015 to decline hosting the contest that year after their victory in 2014. 2010, 2012, 2013, 2015, 2016, 2018, 2019 and 2020 are years that a country has won and has hosted the following year's edition.

Kyiv, Minsk and Yerevan have hosted the contest twice.

Contests
Future contests are shown in italics.

Opening ceremony venue

Gallery

See also 
 List of ABU Song Festivals host cities
 List of Eurovision Song Contest host cities

Notes

References

External links

Host cities
Junior Eurovision Song Contest
Junior Eurovision Song Contest